In logic, the comprehension of an object is the totality of intensions, that is, attributes, characters, marks, properties, or qualities, that the object possesses, or else the totality of intensions that are pertinent to the  context of a given discussion.  This is the correct technical term for the whole collection of intensions of an object, but it is common in less technical usage to see 'intension' used for both the composite and the primitive ideas.

See also
 Extension
 Extensional definition
 Intension
 Intensional definition

Concepts in logic
Definition